SigmaPlot is a proprietary software package for scientific graphing and data analysis. It runs on Microsoft Windows.

The software can read multiple formats, such as Microsoft Excel spreadsheets, and can also perform mathematical transforms and statistical analyses. A single product license costs approximately $1000, though a free 30-day trial is available as well.

History 
SigmaPlot was developed by Jandel Corporation for Windows 3.1x and maintained by them until version 4.0. In 1996, Jandel Corporation merged into SPSS Inc. SigmaPlot was maintained by SPSS through version 8. As of version 9, it is owned and maintained by SYSTAT Software. The current version is 15.x for Windows 2000 to Windows 10.

Alternatives and clones 

The main concurrent of SigmaPlot is currently Origin. Open-source projects inspired by Origin include QtiPlot (prior to v0.9.9, now proprietary) and SciDAVis.

References

External links 
 SigmaPlot, official site
 Sigmaplot  tutorial, YouTube video

Earth sciences graphics software
Plotting software